In mathematics, the Kadison–Singer problem, posed in 1959, was a problem in functional analysis about whether certain extensions of certain linear functionals on certain C*-algebras were unique. The uniqueness was proved in 2013.

The statement arose from work on the foundations of quantum mechanics done by Paul Dirac in the 1940s and was formalized in 1959 by Richard Kadison and Isadore Singer. The problem was subsequently shown to be equivalent to numerous open problems in pure mathematics, applied mathematics, engineering and computer science. Kadison, Singer, and most later authors believed the statement to be false, but, in 2013, it was proven true by Adam Marcus, Daniel Spielman and Nikhil Srivastava, who received the 2014 Pólya Prize for the achievement.

The solution was made possible by a reformulation provided by Joel Anderson, who showed in 1979 that his "paving conjecture", which only involves operators on finite-dimensional Hilbert spaces, is equivalent to the Kadison–Singer problem. Nik Weaver provided another reformulation in a finite-dimensional setting, and this version was proved true using random polynomials.

Original formulation
Consider the separable Hilbert space ℓ2 and two related C*-algebras: the algebra  of all continuous linear operators from ℓ2 to ℓ2, and the algebra  of all diagonal continuous linear operators from ℓ2 to ℓ2.

Kadison and Singer conjectured that, for the case of pure states, this extension is unique. That is, the Kadison–Singer problem consisted in proving or disproving the following statement: 
to every pure state  on  there exists a unique state on  that extends .
This claim is in fact true.

Paving conjecture reformulation
The Kadison–Singer problem has a positive solution if and only if the following "paving conjecture" is true:

For every  there exists a natural number  so that the following holds: for every  and every linear operator  on the -dimensional Hilbert space  with zeros on the diagonal there exists a partition of  into  sets  such that

Equivalent discrepancy statement
The following "discrepancy" statement, again equivalent to the Kadison–Singer problem because of previous work by Nik Weaver, was proven by Marcus/Spielman/Srivastava using a technique of random polynomials:

This statement implies the following:

Then there exists a partition of  into two sets  and  such that, for :

Here the "discrepancy" becomes visible when α is small enough: the quadratic form on the unit sphere can be split into two roughly equal pieces, i.e. pieces whose values don't differ much from 1/2 on the unit sphere.
In this form, the theorem can be used to derive statements about certain partitions of graphs.

References

External links

Operator algebras
Quantum mechanics